Pfeiffer v Deutsches Rotes Kreuz, Kreisverband Waldshut eV (2005) C-397/01-403/01 is an EU law and European labour law case concerning the Working Time Directive. It is relevant for the Working Time Regulations 1998 in UK labour law.

Facts
Workers of the German Red Cross, including Mr Pfeiffer, who served as emergency workers, doing ambulance runs claimed that a collective agreement that set their hours at 49 hours per week violated the Working Time Directive. The Red Cross contended that as emergency workers they were akin to civil servants and thus fell outside the Directive's scope.

Judgment
The Grand Chamber of the Court of Justice held that workers could not be asked to work 49 hours a week by a collective agreement. They had to opt out individually. As a starting matter it held that the exception for civil servants was not applicable, holding that ‘the civil protection service in the strict sense thus defined, at which the provision is aimed, can be clearly distinguished from the activities of emergency workers tending the injured and sick which are at issue in the main proceedings.’ The ‘worker's consent must be given not only individually but also expressly and freely’.

See also

Inequality of bargaining power
Working Time Directive
Allonby v Accrington and Rossendale College (2004) C-256/01, [67]-[71], also on the dependent position of workers

Notes

2005 in the European Union
German case law
Court of Justice of the European Union case law
2005 in case law
2005 in Germany
European Union labour case law